The term Diversey may refer to:
 Diversey (CTA), an 'L' station on the CTA Brown Line.
 Diversey Holdings, manufacturer of cleaning and hygiene products.
 Diversey Parkway (Chicago)

People with the name Diversey:
 Michael Diversey (1810 – 1869), an American beer brewer.